Interface is a 1984 American science fiction comedy-horror film starring John Davies, Lauren Lane and Mathew Sacks. It was Lou Diamond Phillips's first film role, as Punk #1. Primarily directed by Andy Anderson, Interface was a production of Anderson's film program at the University of Texas at Arlington. The film was scripted, acted, and initially directed entirely by UTA students.

The movie takes place on a fictional college campus. Davies, starring as a professor, discovers a secret society of masked hackers on campus; they seemingly kill his star pupil. Hobson attempts to uncover and neutralize the society, even as he himself becomes a suspect in his student's death.

References

External links
 

1984 films
1984 horror films
1980s science fiction films
American comedy horror films
1980s comedy horror films
1984 comedy films
1980s English-language films
1980s American films